Diaphanos is a genus of butterflies in the family Nymphalidae. There are three recognised species in the Neotropics, and one undescribed subspecies of D. huberi.

Species
Diaphanos curvignathos Viloria, 1994
Diaphanos fuscus Viloria, 1994
Diaphanos huberi Adams & Bernard, 1981

Taxonomy
The type species by original designation is Diaphanos huberi Adams & Bernard, 1981 from the Cordillera de Merida in Venezuela. It was originally considered to be a monobasic genus, but two additional species were described from separate mountaintops in the Venezuelan Andes.

References

 , 1981, Pronophiline butterflies (Satyridae) of the Cordillera de Mérida, Venezuela, Zoological Journal of the Linnean Society 71: 343-373.

Satyrini
Butterfly genera